Ptolemy, son of Agesarchos was a governor of Cyprus for the Hellenistic Ptolemy Egypt.

In 204 BC, Ptolemy was send to Rome as an ambassador. Between 197 and 180 BC Ptolemy was governor of Cyprus, after having inherited the office by Polykrates of Argos, the son of Mnasiades. His daughter was Eirene of Alexandria, who went on to become an Panathenaian victor, and a priestess for the Ptolemaic queen.

References 

Ptolemaic governors of Cyprus
2nd-century BC Greek people